Satavahana Express (Train No: 12713/12714) is a daily Superfast Intercity Express train that runs between Vijayawada Junction in Andhra Pradesh and Secunderabad Junction in Telangana. This train belongs to Vijayawada Division of South Central Railway Zone.

Services
The Electrical catering facility is available in the train giving access to the passenger to have the food online ordered delivered at their respective seats. Good quality Mysuru vada, and Masala Bonda are served along with Starbucks Coffee, Iced Honey Peach Tea and Cake.

Etymology 

The train is called Satavahana in honour of the Satavahana dynasty which ruled areas of Guntur district in Andhra Pradesh and Telangana. The train is also known as Swethavahana Express by the local Hyderabadis meaning the White Vehicle (Swan), due to the White WAP-7 locomotive from Lallaguda Electric Loco Shed hauling this train. An early morning departure from Vijayawada and reaching Secundrabad in the afternoon.

Route and Halts

Traction and coach composition

It is hauled by a WAP-7 or WAP-4 locomotive from end to end.
Coach composition of Satavahana Express 
From Vijayawada to Secunderabad (12713)
It runs with ICF-CBC coaches (Green indicating Electric locomotive, Yellow indicating colour of the general coaches, pink indicating reserved coaches and blue indicating AC coaches)

From Secunderabad to Vijayawada(12714)
It runs with ICF-CBC coaches (Green indicating Electric locomotive, Yellow indicating colour of the general coaches, pink indicating reserved coaches and blue indicating AC coaches)

See also 
 List of named passenger trains in India

References

External links 
 Satavahana Schedule
  Ecatering IRCTC

Vijayawada railway division
Transport in Secunderabad
Named passenger trains of India
Rail transport in Telangana
Rail transport in Andhra Pradesh
Express trains in India